Geranosaurus (meaning "crane reptile") is a genus of ornithischian dinosaur from the Early Jurassic. It is known only from crushed fragments of the skull, a single jaw bone with nine tooth stubs and limb elements discovered in the Clarens Formation, South Africa in 1871. Because of the limited remains, it is considered a nomen dubium. It is classified as an ornithischian based on the jaw, probably a heterodontosaurid.

The type species, G. atavus, was described by Robert Broom in 1911. The genus name is derived from Greek geranos, "crane", a reference to the crane-like hind-limb. The specific name means "ancestor" in Latin. The limb elements have inventory number SAM 1871.

References 

Heterodontosaurids
Early Jurassic dinosaurs of Africa
Jurassic South Africa
Fossils of South Africa
Fossil taxa described in 1911
Taxa named by Robert Broom
Nomina dubia
Ornithischian genera